Jean Nohain (1900–1981) was a French playwright, lyricist, and screenwriter, and a radio and television producer and presenter. He was the son of the librettist Franc-Nohain and the brother of the actor Claude Dauphin.

Selected filmography
 Arsene Lupin, Detective (1937)
 The Tale of the Fox (1937)
 Whirlwind of Paris (1939)
 Sing Anyway (1940)
 Radio Surprises (1940)
 Soyez les bienvenus (1953)

References

Bibliography 
 Dayna Oscherwitz & MaryEllen Higgins. The A to Z of French Cinema. Scarecrow Press, 2009.

External links 
 

Writers from Paris
1900 births
1981 deaths
20th-century French screenwriters
French lyricists
French children's writers
Lycée Condorcet alumni
Order of the Francisque recipients
Burials at Père Lachaise Cemetery